Andi Oddang (born 16 September 1977 in Makassar) is an Indonesian former footballer.

References

External links
 Andi Oddang at Goal
 Andi Oddang at Soccerway

Living people
1977 births
Sportspeople from Makassar
Indonesian footballers
Persim Maros players
PSM Makassar players
Sriwijaya F.C. players
Persekabpas Pasuruan players
Persebaya Surabaya players
Liga 1 (Indonesia) players
Association football forwards